Thomas C. Hopkins (died May 5, 1948) was an American politician from Maryland. He served as a member of the Maryland House of Delegates, representing Harford County, from 1912 to 1914.

Early life
Thomas C. Hopkins was born to Cassandra Lee (née Grover) and W. Worthington Hopkins. His father was a physician. His grandfather was Thomas Chew Hopkins, a member of the Maryland House of Delegates in 1843 and 1865.

Career
Hopkins was a Democrat. He served as a member of the Maryland House of Delegates, representing Harford County, from 1912 to 1914. Hopkins ran for re-election in 1915, but was defeated by Thomas H. Ward by a margin of 10 votes. Hopkins contested the election, but was unsuccessful in his case.

Personal life
Hopkins married Marie M. LeGare. Hopkins lived at Gover's Hill in Havre de Grace, Maryland.

Hopkins died on May 5, 1948, at his home, the Repulta Farm in Govers Hill Road in Havre de Grace. He was buried at Darlington Cemetery.

References

External links

Year of birth missing
1948 deaths
People from Havre de Grace, Maryland
Democratic Party members of the Maryland House of Delegates